The Groop were a harmony-based psychedelic pop and soul vocal quartet from the USA, active at the end of the 1960s and releasing one self-titled album. Their song "A Famous Myth" was included on the contemporary Midnight Cowboy film soundtrack.

Corlynn Hanney (born on March 3, 1945) died on December 15, 2020. She had suffered from Lewy body dementia, and died of COVID-19, at age 75.

References

Discography

The Groop (1969)

Dream pop musical groups
Psychedelic pop music groups
Vocal quartets
Musical groups from Los Angeles